Best Buy Europe Distributions Ltd. was a retail joint venture owned by the United States based electronics retailer Best Buy Inc and United Kingdom based mobile phone retailer Carphone Warehouse. The company was formed by Best Buy's purchase of 50% of The Carphone Warehouse's retail division in May 2008. Best Buy branded superstores opened in the United Kingdom beginning on April 30, 2010, with a store in Thurrock, Essex. Best Buy was due to open its first stores in the United Kingdom in 2009, but in March 2009, the firm postponed this until 2010, with plans for up to two hundred stores eventually. Carphone originally intended to open up to two hundred Big Box stores in Europe by 2013, but this goal was reduced to one hundred. On November 6 2011, Carphone Warehouse announced its intention to close the eleven Best Buy "big box" format stores. On 14 January 2012, the Best Buy Europe joint venture was discontinued, with all eleven stores and the transactional website (www.bestbuy.co.uk) closing on that day.

History
Best Buy Co., Inc. is a Fortune 100 company, and the largest speciality retailer of consumer electronics in the United States and Canada, accounting for 21% of the market. The company's subsidiaries include Geek Squad, Magnolia Audio Video, and Pacific Sales; in Canada the Best Buy Canada subsidiary also operated under the Future Shop label until 2015.

Together, these operate more than 1,150 stores in the United States, Puerto Rico, Canada, China, Mexico and Turkey. The company's corporate headquarters are located in Richfield, Minnesota, United States (near Minneapolis). On June 26, 2007, Best Buy announced a 40% increase in its operations, with plans to operate more than 1,800 stores worldwide, including 1,400 Best Buy stores in the United States.

The Carphone Warehouse was co founded in 1989, when most portable phones were too bulky to carry and called car phones, by then CEO Charles Dunstone (together with David Ross) from £6,000 savings. The two companies first began working together in 2006, creating Best Buy Mobile stores in the United States and introducing Geek Squad in the United Kingdom.

The first Best Buy store in the United Kingdom opened at Junction Retail Park, near Lakeside Shopping Centre in Thurrock, Essex on 30 April 2010.

Twenty locations were originally planned for in the coming year, all to be in the big box format. The company was looking for a flagship store in Central London by July 2008, in a prominent area such as Piccadilly Circus, Oxford Street, or Regent Street.

For fiscal year 2011, Best Buy UK saw full year losses nearly triple to £62.2m, equivalent to just over £10m for each of its stores trading during the period. Growth had been slower than some expected. The company blamed the grim results on "impressive" investments in its new stores but it is "evaluating" the next step in its strategy. The company had been reported to be considering bidding for Comet Group.

The company closed all of its stores in the United Kingdom on January 14, 2012 due to poor financial results. The Best Buy/Carphone Warehouse partnership ended in June 2013, with Carphone buying back their 50% share from the American retailer.

Locations
 Lakeside Shopping Centre, Thurrock
 Southampton, Hedge End Retail Park
 Dudley, Merry Hill Shopping Centre
 Aintree, Racecourse Retail Park
 Croydon, Trafalgar Way Retail Park
 Derby, Kingsway Retail Park
 Hayes, Lombardy Retail Park
 Cribbs Causeway, Bristol
 Rotherham, Retail World Shopping Park
 Enfield, Enfield Retail Park
 Nottingham, Castle Marina Retail Park

References

Best Buy
Consumer electronics retailers of the United Kingdom
British subsidiaries of foreign companies
Retail companies established in 2006
Retail companies disestablished in 2012